CF, Cf, cf and similar may refer to:

Arts and entertainment
 "Commercial film", the term for a television advertisement in South Korea
 Captain Flamingo, a Canadian animated television series
 Christopher Forgues, an artist and musician based in Providence, Rhode Island, United States; known as C.F.

Computing
 .cf, the Top-Level Domain for Central African Republic
 .NET Compact Framework, a version of the .NET Framework for mobile and embedded devices
 Adobe ColdFusion, a web application development platform
 Collaborative filtering, a method of making predictions by collecting information from many users
 CompactFlash, a type of memory card
 Compact Floppy, a variation of floppy disk
 Consolidation function, in computer science
 Core Foundation, a C application programming interface in Mac OS X
 Coupling Facility, an IBM mainframe feature
 CurseForge, a website offering mods for various video games

Science and technology
 Haplogroup CF (Y-DNA)
 Carbon monofluoride, a solid material
 Carbon fibers, a fiber made of carbon, typically used in carbon fibers composites
 Californium, symbol Cf, a chemical element
 Climate and Forecast Metadata Conventions, for Earth science data
 Conductivity factor, the level of dissolved salts in a solution
 Conflat, an abbreviation of a special type of vacuum flange
 Cystic fibrosis, a hereditary multisystem autosomal recessive disease
 Capacity factor, a ratio of an actual electrical energy output of a power plant over a period of time to the maximum possible electrical energy output.

Places
 CF postcode area, for Cardiff and Mid Glamorgan (United Kingdom) post codes
 Central African Republic, 2-letter ISO country code
 Chinatown Fair, a video arcade in Brooklyn, New York, United States

Sports
 Canopy formation, a discipline in parachuting
 Center fielder, a defensive position in baseball
 Centre forward, an attacking position in Association football
 Football club (Club de Fútbol) in Spain

Other uses
 cf., an abbreviation for the Latin word confer, meaning "compare" or "consult"
 Cadillac Fairview, a Canadian commercial real estate owner and management company
 Canadian Forces, Canada's military
 Chaplain to the Forces, post-nominal initials for army chaplains
 Clinton Foundation,  a nonprofit corporation established by former President of the United States Bill Clinton
 Cohesion Fund, one of the European Structural and Investment Funds of the European Union